Keisha Lance Bottoms (born January 18, 1970) is an American attorney and politician who served as the 60th mayor of Atlanta, Georgia, from 2018 to 2022. She was elected mayor in 2017. Before becoming mayor, she was a member of the Atlanta City Council, representing part of Southwest Atlanta. Bottoms did not run for a second term as mayor. President Joe Biden nominated Bottoms as vice chair of civic engagement and voter protection at the DNC for the 2021–2025 term. In June 2022, Bottoms joined the Biden administration as senior advisor and director of the White House Office of Public Engagement where she served until February 2023.

Early life and education
Bottoms was born in Atlanta, Georgia, on January 18, 1970, to Sylvia Robinson and R&B singer-songwriter Major Lance. She was raised in Atlanta  and is a graduate of Frederick Douglass High School.

She earned a bachelor's degree in communications from Florida A&M University, concentrating in broadcast journalism.  She earned a J.D. degree from Georgia State University College of Law in 1994. She is a member of Delta Sigma Theta sorority.

Early career 
Bottoms was a prosecutor and also represented children in juvenile court. In 2002, she became a magistrate judge in Atlanta. In 2008, she ran unsuccessfully for a judgeship on the Fulton Superior Court.

Bottoms was elected to the Atlanta City Council in 2009 and 2013, representing District 11 in southwest Atlanta. She served until 2017. She was concurrently the executive director of Atlanta Fulton County Recreation Authority starting in 2015.

Mayor of Atlanta

Election 

Bottoms was elected mayor of Atlanta in 2017, after receiving a plurality of votes (26%) in a crowded field of candidates on election day, then defeating fellow city council member Mary Norwood in the runoff election. She is the sixth African American and the second African American woman to serve as mayor of Atlanta.

Bottoms was investigated during the mayoral election for several lump payments to campaign staff totaling more than $180,000 that were not reported properly. In October 2017, she voluntarily returned $25,700 in campaign contributions she had received from PRAD Group, an engineering contractor whose office had been raided by the Federal Bureau of Investigation the previous month. On November 4, 2017, she called on the attorney general of Georgia to investigate fake robocalls made in her name.

Tenure 
Bottoms declared that Atlanta was a "welcoming city" and "will remain open and welcoming to all" following then-president Donald Trump's actions regarding refugees in the United States. In 2018, she signed an executive order forbidding the city jail to hold ICE detainees. In July 2019, Bottoms said, "Our city does not support ICE. We don't have a relationship with the U.S. Marshal[s] Service. We closed our detention center to ICE detainees, and we would not pick up people on an immigration violation."

In February 2020, Bottoms released Atlanta's first LGBTQ Affairs report that focused on how various policies, initiatives, and programs can improve the lives of LGBTQ Atlantans. In 2018, she had created the city's first LGBTQ advisory board, which included entertainer Miss Lawrence and activist Feroza Syed. In December 2020, Bottoms appointed the city's first director of LGBTQ Affairs, Malik Brown, and announced the continued LGBTQ advisory board leadership.

Bottoms strongly rebuked Georgia Governor Brian Kemp after he announced the reopening of Georgia businesses in April 2020, saying that it was too early in the COVID-19 pandemic.

When Atlanta experienced riots in the wake of the murder of George Floyd, Bottoms condemned those involved, but later expressed optimism while speaking to demonstrators at a protest, saying, "There is something better on the other side of this." She also repeatedly condemned Trump for "making it worse" and stoking racial tensions, and encouraged people to vote, saying, "If you want change in America, go and register to vote. That is the change we need in this country." In June 2020, many Atlanta Police Department officers went on strike to protest the charges brought against the officers involved in the killing of Rayshard Brooks. Bottoms said that APD morale "is down tenfold".

In early July 2020, as COVID-19 cases escalated in Atlanta, Bottoms issued an executive order rolling back some of its reopening measures from Phase 2 to Phase 1 and requiring everyone within the city limits to wear a facial covering, but no citations enforcing it were issued. On July 15, Georgia Governor Brian Kemp issued an order suspending all local mask mandates, and on July 16 he filed suit against Bottoms in Superior Court, seeking to invalidate her order and prevent her from talking about it. He did not file similar suits against other Georgia cities with mask mandates, such as Savannah and Athens. A hearing scheduled for July 21 was postponed when the judge recused herself.

In May 2021, Bottoms announced she would not run for reelection in the 2021 Atlanta mayoral election.

2020 presidential election 

In June 2019, Bottoms endorsed Joe Biden in the 2020 Democratic Party presidential primaries. After Biden promised during a March 2020 CNN debate to choose a woman as his running mate, Politico reported her as a possible pick. In June, CNN reported that Bottoms was among his top four choices, along with Representative Val Demings and Senators Kamala Harris and Elizabeth Warren. Harris was officially announced as Biden's running mate on August 11, 2020.

Bottoms was named a permanent co-chair of the 2020 Democratic National Convention, at which she was featured as a speaker.

Biden administration

After Biden's election, Bottoms was mentioned as a possible candidate for United States Secretary of Housing and Urban Development. In January 2021, Biden and Harris nominated Bottoms for a four-year term as the vice chair of civic engagement and voter participation at the Democratic National Committee, a role focused on protecting voting rights and expanding voter participation.

In June 2022, it was announced that President Joe Biden had picked Bottoms to replace Cedric Richmond as the director of the Office of Public Liaison. On February 27, 2023 it was announced that Bottoms would be replaced by Stephen K. Benjamin in April 2023.

Personal life 
Bottoms' family history can be traced back five generations to Shepherd Peek, a freedman from a plantation near Crawfordville, who may have served in the Georgia state legislature during Reconstruction.

In October 1994, she married Derek W. Bottoms at Ben Hill United Methodist Church in Atlanta. They met three years earlier during their first year as students at Georgia State University College of Law. After unsuccessful attempts to conceive biologically, they adopted their four children.

Her husband is the vice president of employment practices and associate relations for The Home Depot. He joined the company in 2000, after spending more than five years at the law firm of Powell Goldstein. He has served as a board member for several foundations.

Bottoms was invited to become a member of The Links, a social and service organization of prominent Black women that was founded in 1946 and is based in Washington, D.C.

See also 
 Joe Biden Supreme Court candidates
 List of mayors of the 50 largest cities in the United States

References

External links 
Campaign website 

 Instagram page

|-

|-

1970 births
20th-century African-American people
20th-century African-American women
21st-century African-American politicians
21st-century African-American women
21st-century American politicians
21st-century American women politicians
African-American city council members in Georgia (U.S. state)
African-American mayors in Georgia (U.S. state)
African-American women mayors
Atlanta City Council members
Biden administration personnel
Florida A&M University alumni
Georgia (U.S. state) Democrats
Georgia State University College of Law alumni
Living people
Mayors of Atlanta
Women city councillors in Georgia (U.S. state)
Women mayors of places in Georgia (U.S. state)